Derrycrin (Eglish) is a townland in County Tyrone, Northern Ireland. It is situated in the historic barony of Dungannon Upper and the civil parish of Ballinderry and covers an area of 444 acres. 

The name derives from the Irish: Doire Críon (withered) or doire chaorthainn (Grove of the mountain ash).

The population of the townland declined during the 19th century:

See also
Derrycrin
Derrycrin (Conyngham)
List of townlands of County Tyrone

References

Townlands of County Tyrone
Civil parish of Ballinderry